James A. Parker (April 30, 1922August 21, 1994) was an African-American Foreign Service Officer for the United States Department of State. In 1963, while at Boston University, he won a housing discrimination lawsuit in Lexington, Massachusetts.

He was born in Baltimore, Maryland, to Roxie and William Parker. After serving in World War II as a U.S. Army sergeant, he earned a bachelor's degree in public administration from American University. In 1947, Parker became a career Foreign Service Officer, serving in Liberia, Nigeria, and Spain. On a year's leave, he enrolled in the African Studies Program at Boston University. While there, he sought to rent a house in Lexington, but was rebuffed by the owner Mark Moore, Jr. His lawsuit led to a protest on the Lexington Battle Green.

Parker later served in Douala and Yaoundé, Cameroon, where he was consul general and later deputy chief of mission. His last overseas assignment was in La Paz, Bolivia, where he was again deputy chief of mission and chargé d'affaires. He also served as desk officer for Central Africa.

See also
Civil Rights Movement

References

1922 births
1994 deaths
People from Baltimore
American civil servants
African-American diplomats
Boston University alumni
American University School of Public Affairs alumni
United States Army personnel of World War II
United States Army non-commissioned officers
American expatriates in Liberia
American expatriates in Nigeria
American expatriates in Spain
American expatriates in Cameroon
American expatriates in Bolivia
20th-century African-American people